The election for Resident Commissioner to the United States House of Representatives took place on November 5, 1996, the same day as the larger Puerto Rican general election and the United States elections, 1996.

Candidates for Resident Commissioner
 Carlos Romero Barcelo for the New Progressive Party
 Celeste Benítez for the Popular Democratic Party
 Manuel Rodríguez Orellana for the Puerto Rican Independence Party

Election results

See also 
Puerto Rican general election, 1996

References 

Puerto Rico
1996
1996 Puerto Rico elections